The Benthozoa are a proposed basal animal clade consisting of the Porifera and Eumetazoa as sister of the Ctenophora. An alternative phylogeny is given by the Porifera-sister hypothesis in which Porifera are the first diverging animal group.

References

Animal taxa